Challalat El Adhaoura  District is a district of Médéa Province, Algeria.

The district is further divided into 4 municipalities:
Challalat El Adhaoura
Cheniguel
Tafraout
Aïn Ou Ksir

Districts of Médéa Province